Correa pulchella, commonly known as the salmon correa, is a species of small prostrate to erect shrub that is endemic to South Australia. It has glabrous, leathery, narrow oblong to broadly egg-shaped leaves and pendulous, cylindrical, pink to red or orange flowers arranged singly on short side branches.

Description
Flowering mainly occurs from April to September.

Taxonomy
Correa pulchella was first formally described in 1827 by Robert Sweet in his book Flora Australasica from an unpublished description by John Bain Mackay. The seeds had been collected on Kangaroo Island by William Baxter who had been sent to Australia by the plant collector Francis Henchman and grown by Mackay in his Clapton Nursery.

Use in horticulture
Correa pulchella is regarded as one of the most attractive Correa species.
It prefers dry summers with low humidity and well-drained alkaline soils. Propagation from seed is difficult, however semi-mature stem cuttings strike readily. It has gained the Royal Horticultural Society's Award of Garden Merit.

Cultivars
Cultivars include:
'Little Cate', a seedling selection of garden origin with prominently displayed bright pink flowers. It is thought to be a hybrid between two different forms. 
'Pink Mist', a pale-pink flowering form selected from a wild population on the southern Yorke Peninsula .
'Dusky Bells', Correa pulchella × Correa reflexa

References

pulchella
Flora of South Australia
Plants described in 1827
Taxa named by Robert Sweet (botanist)